These are all Hungarian rail border crossings as of 2022. Crossings in bold have passenger traffic.  Crossings in italics are abandoned. The year of opening is in brackets.

Hungary - Slovakia 

As of 2023, 9 border crossings are operating, 3 of them has passanger traffic.

Note that all of these railway lines were built in Austria-Hungary and became border crossings after the Treaty of Trianon in 1920. Some railway lines were dismantled as the borders cut them, so they didn't function as border crossings.

Rajka - Rusovce (1891)
Komárom - Komárno (1910), freight trains only, no passenger traffic since 14 December 2008
Szob - Chľaba (1850)
Nagybörzsöny - Pastovce (1885-1918, Narrow gauge)
Hont - Šahy (1886-1945) (track dismantled)
Ipolytarnóc - Kalonda, freight trains only, no passenger traffic since 2 February 2003
Nógrádszakál - Bušince, freight trains only, no passenger traffic since 2 August 1992
Somoskőújfalu - Fiľakovo (1871), freight trains only, no passenger traffic since 1 May 2011
Bánréve - Lenartovce (1873), freight trains only, no passenger traffic since 12 December 2009
Bánréve - Abovce (1874-1920), track dismanled
Tornanádaska - Turňa nad Bodvou (1890) (track out of use, no traffic)
Hidasnémeti - Kechnec (1860)
Sátoraljaújhely - Slovenské Nové Mesto (1872), freight trains only, no passenger traffic
Zemplénagárd - Pribeník (Canceled, Narrow gauge)

Hungary - Ukraine 
Záhony - Chop (1873) dual gauge 1435/1520 mm
Eperjeske - Solovka (freight only) dual gauge 1435/1520 mm

Hungary - Romania 
As of 2023, 5 border crossings are operating, all of them has passenger traffic.

Note that all of these railway lines were built in Austria-Hungary and became border crossings after the Treaty of Trianon in 1920.
Zajta - Peleș (1898-1920, 1940-1945) (track dismantled)
Csenger - Oar (1908-1920, 1940-1944) (track dismantled)
Tiborszállás - Carei (1905)
Nyírábrány - Valea lui Mihai (1871)
Nagykereki - Santăul Mare (1911-1920, 1940-1945) (track dismantled)
Biharkeresztes - Episcopia Bihor (1858)
Körösnagyharsány - Cheresig (1887-1920, 1940-1944) (track dismantled)
Kötegyán - Salonta (1871)
Kötegyán - Ciumeghiu (1899-1920) (track dismantled)
Elek - Grăniceri (1884-1920) (track dismantled)
Lőkösháza - Curtici (1858)
Battonya - Pecica (1882-1920) (track dismantled)
Apátfalva - Cenad (1903-1920) (track dismantled)

Hungary - Serbia 
As of 2023, one border crossing is operating, there is no passenger traffic.

Note that all of these railway lines were built in Austria-Hungary and became border crossings after the Treaty of Trianon in 1920.
Szőreg - Rabe (1857-1920) (track dismantled), see Szeged-Temesvár railway
Vedresháza - Đala (1897-1946) (track dismantled)
Röszke - Horgoš (1869), freight only, no passenger traffic since 10 November 2015
Kelebia - Subotica (1882), see Budapest–Belgrade railway (no traffic until 2025 due to reconstruction works)
Csikéria - Subotica (1885-1944) (track dismantled)
Ólegyen - Riđica (1903-1944) (track dismantled)
Gara - Riđica (1895-1944) (track dismantled)
Hercegszántó - Bački Breg (1912-1944) (track dismantled)

Hungary - Croatia 

Note that all of these railway lines were built in Austria-Hungary and became border crossings after the Treaty of Trianon in 1920.
Magyarbóly - Beli Manastir (1870)
Beremend - Baranjsko Petrovo Selo (track dismantled)
Drávaszabolcs - Donji Miholjac (track dismantled)
Drávasztára-Zaláta - Noskovci (track dismantled)
Barcs - Virovitica (1885- ?) (track dismantled)
Gyékényes - Botovo (1862)
Murakeresztúr - Kotoriba (1860), freight trains only, no passenger traffic

Hungary - Slovenia 
Rédics - Lendava (track dismantled)
Bajánsenye - Hodoš (2000) (old railway: 1907–1945, rebuilt in 2000 on a new alingment)

Hungary - Austria 
As of 2023, 6 border crossings are operating, all of them has passenger traffic.

Note that all of these railway lines were built in Austria-Hungary and became border crossings after the Treaty of Trianon in 1920.
Szentgotthárd - Mogersdorf (1872)
Kőszeg - Rattersdorf-Liebing (1908-1960) (track dismantled)
Répcevis - Lutzmannsburg (track dismantled)
Szentgotthárd - Deutschkreutz (1908)
Pinkamindszent – Strem (track dismantled)
Ágfalva - Loipersbach-Schattendorf (1847), see Sopron–Wiener Neustadt railway
Sopron - Baumgarten
Fertőszentmiklós - Pamhagen (1897)
Hegyeshalom - Nickelsdorf (1855)

See also 
Polish rail border crossings
Czech rail border crossings
Slovak rail border crossings
 Hungarian State Railways

External links 
Border crossings: Hungary on Enthusiast's Guide to Travelling the Railways of Europe
Map of lines on mavcsoport.hu

Rail transport in Hungary
Rail